Thunder Bay was a federal electoral district in the northwestern part of the province of Ontario, Canada, that was represented in the House of Commons of Canada from 1968 to 1979.

This riding was created in 1966 from parts of Fort William, Kenora—Rainy River and Port Arthur ridings.

It consisted of the eastern part of the territorial district of Rainy River; (b) the territorial district of Thunder Bay excluding the Cities of Fort William and Port Arthur and the Townships of Aldina, Blake, Crooks, Devon, Fraleigh, Gillies, Hartington, Lismore, Lybster, Marks, Neebing, O'Connor, Paipoonge, Pardee, Pearson, Scoble, Strange, Adrian, Blackwell, Conmee, Forbes, Fowler, Goldie, Gorham, Horne, Jacques, Laurie, MacGregor, McIntyre, McTavish, Oliver, Sackville, Sibley and Ware; the southeastern part of the territorial district of Kenora; part of the Patricia Portion of the territorial district of Kenora; and the western part of the territorial district of Algoma.

The electoral district was abolished in 1976 when it was redistributed between Cochrane North, Kenora—Rainy River, Thunder Bay—Atikokan and Thunder Bay—Nipigon ridings.

Electoral history

|- 
  
|Liberal
|B. Keith PENNER  
|align="right"| 9,540 
 
|New Democratic Party
|Douglas M.   SLY
|align="right"| 6,081 
  
|Progressive Conservative
|George C. WARDROPE
|align="right"|4,904    

|- 
  
|Liberal
|Keith PENNER  
|align="right"|11,048
 
|New Democratic Party
|Ike MUTCH
|align="right"| 6,309
  
|Progressive Conservative
|Harvey  SMITH
|align="right"| 5,095    

|- 
  
|Liberal
|Keith PENNER  
|align="right"| 11,435 
 
|New Democratic Party
| Carson HOY
|align="right"| 5,475 
  
|Progressive Conservative
|Berek KADIKOFF
|align="right"| 4,021

See also 

 List of Canadian federal electoral districts
 Past Canadian electoral districts

External links 

 Website of the Parliament of Canada

Former federal electoral districts of Ontario
Politics of Thunder Bay